Pseudophoxinus battalgilae, also known as the Beysehir minnow or Tuz Lake spring minnow, is a species of ray-finned fish in the family Cyprinidae. It is found in Lake Beyşehir and Lake Tuz in Central Anatolia, Turkey.

Its natural habitat is freshwater lakes.

References

Pseudophoxinus
Endemic fauna of Turkey
Fish described in 1997
Taxonomy articles created by Polbot
Taxobox binomials not recognized by IUCN